Girls Frontline is a mobile strategy role-playing game for Android and iOS developed by China-based studio MICA Team, where players control echelons of android characters, known in-universe as T-Dolls, each carrying a distinctive real-world firearm. The game was released in Mainland China on 20 May 2016, in Hong Kong and Taiwan on 18 January 2017, and in South Korea on 30 June 2017. The global English version was released on 8 May 2018, while the Japanese version was released on 1 August 2018 under the title  due to the Girls Frontline trademark in Japan already being held by another registrant.

Girls' Frontline is a prequel of another game developed by MICA Team, Codename: Bakery Girl, released in 2013. Two television anime series based on Girls Frontline have been produced, and an official manga is serialised monthly.  A new anime television series by Asahi Production aired from January to March 2022.

Gameplay

The gameplay involves the acquisition of T-Dolls through gacha game mechanics, where the amount of resources spent on construction can affect the T-Doll acquired. T-Dolls can then be assembled into squads known as echelons and sent into battle to complete combat missions, simulations, or logistics support tasks. The T-Dolls are female moe androids each inspired by one real-world small arm. They are categorised into different classes such as handguns, submachine guns, assault rifles, rifles, machine guns and shotguns.

Missions consist of a turn-based strategic battlefield where the player directs echelons across a map consisting of linked nodes with the goal of fulfilling pre-determined mission requirements, such as capturing an enemy command node or rescuing hostage units. Players are able to deploy and move echelons during their turn by expending action points, which depend on the number of heliports controlled and the number of echelons deployed. The enemy units move during enemy turns based on preset instructions. If a player's echelon meets an enemy unit on the same node, a combat sequence is initiated. Combat is largely automated, but players can activate offensive and defensive skills specific to each T-Doll in real-time as well as move individual T-Dolls across a formation consisting of a 3×3 square grid. The position of T-Dolls within the echelon's starting formation provide stat enhancements to other T-Dolls, and the individual stats and abilities of the T-Dolls altogether determine the outcome of the battle against the enemy team. Some missions, known as night-time battles, will handicap the player with a limit to the number of turns possible as well as include a fog of war mechanic restricting visibility over the strategic map. A score based ranking map is unlocked at the end of every major in-game event, where players can compete for rewards based on their highest score relative to other players during the event.

T-Dolls can also be acquired through random drops after battles in addition to the construction component of the game. T-Doll stats can be complemented by equipment, which are also obtained via a gacha-based construction system or from drops in night battles. Tactical fairies are non-combatant support units that can be added to echelons to provide status buffs to T-Dolls and either have in-battle abilities or skills that can affect the map; in-universe, they are described as AI-equipped tactical drones. In later stages of the game, the player will unlock Heavy Ordnance Corps (HOC) units, which are dedicated fire support units such as mortar teams and anti-tank weapons that can provide supporting fire to echelons in combat. The end-game content also introduces the Protocol Assimilation system, where enemy Sangvis Ferri units can be captured and then sent into battle.

Outside of combat, the player is required to manage their supply of in-game resources, level up facilities within the base to gain economic bonuses or access to different features, and improve the combat stats and abilities of T-Dolls through skill training and other character-raising mechanics. Cosmetic items such as T-Doll costumes and furniture used to decorate the dormitories of T-Dolls are obtained through another separate token-based gacha system. Decorating dormitories also increases a T-Dolls' affection stats through collecting hearts daily. Additionally, some cosmetic items for the commander avatar can also be bought using gems that can be purchased through real-world microtransactions or procured via daily login. When a T-Doll's affection stat reaches 100, the player is able to give them an OATH ring, which may be purchased through gems in the shop. Their affection cap will increase to 150 and they will receive a slight stat boost.

Synopsis

The game is set in a war-torn future where tactical dolls, more commonly known as T-Dolls, are almost exclusively used for combat in place of humans, some having been repurposed from their previous life as civilian androids. The majority of the world is uninhabitable due to contamination from the Collapse Fluid, and much of humankind is dead. In 2062, the artificial intelligence of Sangvis Ferri (SF) spontaneously rebels against humanity, with their T-Dolls and robots killing their human masters and taking over nearby areas. In response, the private military company (PMC) Griffin & Kryuger (G&K) is hired to contain and eliminate Sangvis Ferri forces; the player assumes the role of a recently promoted G&K Commander. The base storyline focuses on the adventures of this commander and the Anti-Rain (AR) Team consisting of M4A1, ST AR-15, M4 SOPMOD II, M16A1, and RO635. Other important characters include the commander's logistics officer, Kalina, AK-12, AN-94, AK-15, RPK-16 and Angelia of Squad DEFY and Squad 404, made up of UMP45, UMP9, 416, and Gr G11.

Collaboration events
The game has had several collaboration events with other game companies. On 4 September 2018, the PlayStation 4 rhythm game DJMax Respect introduced three songs from Girls Frontline as DLC, while time-limited DJMax Respect mission events were added to the global release of Girls Frontline in May 2020.

A collaboration event for Honkai Gakuen took place in November 2017 for the Chinese release of Girls Frontline, and featured characters from that game as guest T-Dolls. On November 20, 2018, Girls Frontline featured a crossover event with Arc System Works where Noel Vermillion and Elphelt Valentine from BlazBlue and Guilty Gear respectively would appear in the game as recruitable allies. In 2019, the game featured a collaboration event with VA-11 Hall-A, which included the addition of mission events and VA-11 HALL-A characters as obtainable T-Dolls. In 2020, a collaboration event with the Gunslinger Girl franchise took place where 5 of the cyborgs were obtainable T-Dolls with added mission events and puzzles themed after the franchise.

In January 2020, Girls Frontline collaborated with Ubisoft's Tom Clancy's The Division where the T-Dolls of Griffin PMC join an online tournament of the Division game. The event also introduced two new characters to recruit; Agent 416 and Agent Vector, who are alternative universe versions of the characters HK416 and Vector that joined the Division.

During a livestream, Girls Frontline announced a collaboration event with the anime Dropkick on My Devil! where the main character Jashin-chan and four of her friends are available to recruit in the game which began on November 16, 2021.

Development
MICA Team originally started as a dōjin circle consisting of three people, however during the development of Girls Frontline, gradually expanded into a company of 117 employees. The game began as an inspiration work based on Kantai Collection, however with the premise of anthropomorphized warships replaced with that of firearms, based on the team's anticipations that similar moe anthropomorphism games would become popular in China.

Media

Anime
A chibi-style television anime series featuring 12 short episodes titled  aired on Tokyo MX and BS11 from October 5 to December 21, 2019. A second series of animated shorts titled  streamed on Bilibili and aired on Tokyo MX and BS11 from December 28, 2019, to March 14, 2020. The Bilibili releases of both series are voiced in Mandarin Chinese, while the Japanese broadcast versions are voiced in Japanese.

On January 22, 2021, an anime television series adaptation produced by Warner Bros. Japan and animated by Asahi Production was announced. The series is directed by Shigeru Ueda, with Hideyuki Kurata handling series composition, Masaki Yamada designing characters, and Takashi Watanabe composing the music. It aired from January 8 to March 26, 2022, on Tokyo MX, BS11, and AT-X. The opening theme song is "BAD CANDY" by yukaDD, while the ending theme song is "HORIZON" by Team Shachi. Funimation licensed the series outside of Asia. Muse Communication licensed the series in South and Southeast Asia. The English dub streamed on Funimation's website on February 4, 2022.

Characters
Main characters appearing in the Girls' Frontline anime.

Episode list

Manga
Beginning in July 2019, an official manga series titled  and illustrated by Miharu has been published online monthly in Chinese by Bilibili, and serialized in Japanese within the Monthly Comic Rex. There are also four official manga anthology volumes published by Dengeki Bunko titled  consisting of one-shots by various manga artists, and another manga anthology by Ichijinsha with four volumes titled  with its own separate collection of one-shot manga releases.

Audio CDs
The theme song of the game, "Frontline!", is performed in Korean with vocals by Guriri and composition by M2U; the full track is included within the soundtrack CD bundled alongside the official artbook titled The Art Of Girls Frontline Vol.1. A second theme performed in English titled "What Am I Fighting For" features vocals by Akino and is included within a 31-track original game soundtrack released on July 24, 2019. The game's soundtrack also features guest tracks composed by Basiscape. English and Japanese versions of "Frontline!" were later included in the second original soundtrack released on June 17, 2020; the limited edition release of this soundtrack also included a Blu-Ray for the Girls Frontline Orchestra: Dolls with Lycoris radiata concert events which took place in Shanghai and Tokyo.

A character songs collection entitled "ECHOES" was released on August 26, 2020.

Reception

Girls Frontline was the 3rd top-grossing game by revenue on Google Play and the 5th top-grossing game on the Apple App Store for the South Korean region in 2017. The perception that the game doesn't force players to use pay-to-win microtransactions compared to other mobile games, along with its encouragement of player interaction during automatic battles, are often-cited reasons for the game's popularity in South Korea, where it is the first Chinese-developed game to be able to compete with domestically created rivals.

Spin-off games and sequels
The tactical role-playing game Reverse Collapse: Code Name Bakery developed by MICA Team and published by X.D. Network has been announced for Nintendo Switch, Microsoft Windows, and smartphone platforms. Set 30 years after in the same universe as Girls Frontline, it is a remake of the original dōjin game Code Name: Bakery Girl featuring new art, character voices, story, and game mechanics.

A sequel titled Girls Frontline II: Exile was announced in May 2020 for release on smartphone platforms, alongside two spin-off games titled Girls Frontline: Glitch and Project Neural Cloud. Exile will still follow the core design of strategic combat, however will introduce 3D modelling for the characters.

See also
 Azur Lane, a shoot 'em up game featuring moe anthropomorphisms of World War II warships
 Kantai Collection, a Japanese fleet management game which originally popularised the concept of moe anthropomorphism collection games
 Upotte!!, a Japanese manga series and television anime featuring anthropomorphized firearms as schoolgirls

Notes

References

External links
 Official English website
 Official Japanese website
 Healing and Madness chapters anime website 
 Official anime website 
 Girls' Frontline Wiki , an English-language wiki website dedicated to the game

2016 video games
2019 manga
2019 anime television series debuts
2022 anime television series debuts
ASCII Media Works manga
Android (operating system) games
Anime television series based on video games
Asahi Production
Construction and management simulation games
Dengeki Comics
Free-to-play video games
Funimation
Gacha games
Hideyuki Kurata
Ichijinsha manga
IOS games
Military anime and manga
Military science fiction video games
Moe anthropomorphism
Muse Communication
One-shot manga
Post-apocalyptic video games
Raising sims
Science fiction video games
Shōnen manga
Tactical role-playing video games
Video games developed in China
Video games set in Eastern Europe
War video games
Single-player video games